

The Mullum Mullum Creek Trail is a shared use path for cyclists and pedestrians, which follows Mullum Mullum Creek in the outer eastern suburbs in Melbourne, Victoria, Australia.

The path was previously split into two sections, but later linked to form one continuous trail from Templestowe to Croydon.The section of the path between the end of the Yarra River Trail in Templestowe and Park Road in Donvale is the lower section, while the section between the end of the Heads Road in Donvale and Highland Avenue in Croydon is the upper section. The central section between Park Road and Heads Road in Donvale was completed in July 2018 and formally opened on 16 September 2018.

Following the path

Upper section
The upper section starts in the east at the end of Highland Ave. The path heads in a south westerly direction, with at-level road crossing at Kalinda Road, Oban Road, and Oliver Street. The trail then heads under the tunnel, where there is an immediate junction. Trail users can turn left, heading east toward the Belgrave Rail Trail, which initially runs on-road along Larissa Avenue and via Ringwood Lake. The Mullum Mullum Creek Trail takes an immediate right turn west towards Eastland Shopping Centre. A road crossing at Warrandyte Road and a tunnel under Ringwood Street sends you to the end of the EastLink Trail. Continuing under the EastLink onramps leads you under Deep Creek Road and into Yarran Dheran. The path continues north west past sensitive flora and fauna by the concrete path mixed with a series of timber bridges and boardwalks.

An at-level crossing with the junction of Quarry Road and Becketts Road is confronted. Immediately after the road crossing, the trail splits into two. Straight ahead and to the north west is the start of the Koonung Creek Trail. Turning right and northwards, the upper section of the Mullum Mullum Creek continues to its current end point (March 2017) at Heads Road.

The Koonung Creek Trail heads to Doncaster and eventually the Melbourne CBD along the Eastern Freeway. Refer also to Mullum Mullum Creek and Mullum Mullum Creek Park

Central Section
The 1 km remaining 'missing link' of the Mullum Mullum Creek Trail from Heads Road to Park Road south, running along the boundary of Whitefriars College, has existed only as an informal dirt track for several years. Construction through this section has been delayed for various reasons, including the installation of new sewer main infrastructure along the corridor. The 600 metres of sewer pipes are scheduled to be installed by Yarra Valley Water as part of the Donvale Sewerage Project in March 2017. In 2016-17, Manningham Council undertook enabling works at the Park Road end of the trail to allow construction to commence as soon as the sewerage works are completed, with three bridges across the creek being pre-fabricated offsite. This section of the path will be a 2.5 metre-wide concrete surface consisting of three bridges, a 40 metre ramp to span a valley, and several boardwalks.

Prior to September 2018, trail users wishing to travel from Schwerkolt Cottage to the lower section and to the Main Yarra Trail at Templestowe were required to detour, either by continuing along the Koonung Creek Trail up to Park Road, then north down Park Road using the on-road bicycle lanes, to the lower section. Alternatively, trail users can continue on the Mullum Mullum Creek Trail from Beckett Road to the Heads Road terminus, climb Heads Road to the south-west, and then continue north down Park Road to the lower section. Due to the steep and narrow nature of Heads Road, in addition to lacking a footpath or bicycle lane, trail users may wish to take the former detour.

Lower section
The lower section starts at Park Road and continues 8.5 km to the Main Yarra Trail and crosses Heidelberg - Warrandyte Road. On the far side is a wooden bridge and boardwalk - continue to the left - the right leads to a tea house at Beasley's Nursery.

After 1.1 km the path opens up into a more open area and meets the Greengully Trail that enters from the left (south). The intersection is badly signed. Continue past large open areas on the right (east) where Kangaroos/Wallabies can be seen on a regular basis, just 20 km from the Melbourne CBD. Deer have also been sighted.

The trail ends at the confluence of the Mullum Mullum Creek and the Yarra River in Templestowe. A lookout surveys the spot. The Main Yarra Trail starts here.

Connections
The upper section of the trail at Larissa Ave, Ringwood connects to the Belgrave Rail Trail. The northeastern end of the upper section finishes at Highland Ave, Croydon and has an on-road connection to the Tarralla Creek Trail. The northern end of the lower section connects to the Main Yarra Trail. The path also connects to the Greengully Trail 1.2 km south of the Yarra. The southern end of the lower section terminates at Park Rd.

Tarralla Creek Trail Connection
From Highland Ave, a 2.7 km road section, via Croydon station, can be used to reach the Tarralla Creek Trail. Continue on Highland Ave to the Maroondah Highway service lane, using the service lane to the Kent Ave intersection. Cross Maroondah Hwy at Kent Ave. Cyclists may utilise the on-road semi-protected bicycle lanes on Kent Ave. Continue onto Main St, Croydon via the level crossing at the roundabout and Croydon War Memorial. Follow Main St to Hewish Rd, where the Tarralla Creek Trail begins at Croydon Park.

Belgrave Rail Trail Connection
Completed in 2013, the Maroondah Council project "Lake to Creek Link Project" improves the link to Ringwood Lake and the Belgrave Rail Trail beyond. At Larissa Ave, follow the trail to the signalised pedestrian crossing of Maroondah Hwy where the trail enters Ringwood Lake. Continue 250m along the southern side of the lake to a narrow turnoff, taking you across the Lilydale railway line and into Bedford Park. Follow the driveway through Bedford Park to Bedford Rd, crossing Bedford Rd at the signalised intersection at the front of Ringwood Secondary College. The Belgrave Rail Trail begins at the southern end of Lena Grove.

References 

Manningham Leader - grant
Bike rides around Melbourne 3rd edition, 2009, Julia Blunden, Open Spaces Publishing, 
Bike Paths Victoria sixth edition, 2004. Edited and published by Sabey & Associates Pty Ltd. pp127.

External links
 Maroondah BUG - Mullum Mullum Creek Trail
 Yarran Dheran
Friends of Mullum Mullum Valley

Bike paths in Melbourne